An Elephant Never Forgets is a 1934 short cartoon film produced by Fleischer Studios and part of the Color Classics series. The film was directed by Dave Fleischer.

Plot 
In the middle of the jungle, all the animals go to school, singing along. Among these animals is an elephant who leads the chorus, a piglet who is full of mud, and a highly indifferent hippopotamus who walks so slow that a snail rapidly passes him.

When they arrive in class, the elephant sits in front of a hostile monkey who uses a washboard to hit and annoy the elephant. In the meantime, the hippopotamus simply sits outside the class and soundly sleeps.

The teacher, a goose, sings another song while asking the animals various questions. They all reply that they can't remember. However, the elephant proceeds to remind them that he never forgets. This continues until the goose asks the elephant a simple math question, which he shamefully admits to forget, and the class retorts him for it.

After this, the goose makes the class take a test, which she leaves in charge of a turtle.

As a joke, the animals use their quill pens to target the turtle's back, which looks like a dartboard.

After the test, the goose lets the class go home. The hippopotamus wakes up and gleefully runs home faster than a rabbit.

As the animals finish their sing-along song, the monkey kicks the elephant, but gets hurt as the elephant places the washboard in his overalls. Then he hits the monkey in the head and cheerfully recites his favorite slogan, "An elephant never forgets."

Cast 
William Pennell as the elephant/hippo

Animation department  
Roland Crandall: animator
Seymour Kneitel: animator
Jack Scholl: lyrics: song
Sammy Timberg: music: song
Lou Fleischer: music supervisor (uncredited)
Sammy Timberg: musical director (uncredited)

References

External links 
 
 

Great Depression films
Color Classics cartoons
Fleischer Studios short films
Paramount Pictures short films
Short films directed by Dave Fleischer
1934 animated films
1934 films
American buddy films
Animated buddy films
1930s American animated films